Saul Green is the former deputy mayor of Detroit, Michigan. He was appointed the position by former mayor, Ken Cockrel, Jr. and was retained as deputy mayor by the next mayor, Dave Bing. Green is an attorney who oversaw both the Detroit Police and Law Department. 

A Detroit native and 1965 graduate of Mackenzie High School, Green later graduated from the University of Michigan as well as from its law school. He served as US Attorney for the Eastern District of Michigan (1994–2001). Green served as an attorney for the Detroit firm of Miller, Canfield, Paddock & Stone.

External links
"Cockrel taps Saul Green as Deputy Mayor"
Accessmylibrary.com

Detroit City Council members
Lawyers from Detroit
Year of birth missing (living people)
Living people
Mackenzie High School (Michigan) alumni
University of Michigan Law School alumni